Valery Grigoryevich Goborov (January 20, 1966 in Kherson, Ukrainian SSR, USSR – September 7, 1989 in Moscow, USSR) was a Soviet basketball player. He won gold medal at 1988 Summer Olympics and was a champion of the USSR League (1988). He won a silver medal at Eurobasket 1987, in Athens, against Greece. 

September 7, 1989, he died in Moscow in a car crash.

References

External links
 Tombstone

1966 births
1989 deaths
Sportspeople from Kherson
Ukrainian men's basketball players
Soviet men's basketball players
Olympic basketball players of the Soviet Union
Olympic gold medalists for the Soviet Union
Road incident deaths in the Soviet Union
Basketball players at the 1988 Summer Olympics
Olympic medalists in basketball
Medalists at the 1988 Summer Olympics